Jonnie and Brookie are an American pop rock duo originating from Gilbert, Arizona.  The group is best known for winning the Disney N.B.T. (Next Big Thing) contest in 2009 and performing at the Disney Channel Summer at Seas concert tour.

Beginning (1998–2001)
Sisters Jonnie and Brookie Allen began creating and performing music at ages 5 and 3, respectively. It was then that they created the group, Jonnie and Brookie, and began performing shows and concerts across the United States. The group's debut holiday album, titled No Snow for Christmas, was released independently in December 2000. Jonnie was 7 years old and Brookie was 5.

Media and touring (2009–present)
In 2009, Jonnie and Brookie entered the Radio Disney N.B.T. (Next Big Thing) competition. During that time, the group was chosen to perform at the Disney Channel Summer at Seas tour. Other performers on the tour were Tiffany Thornton, Mitchel Musso, Debby Ryan, Alyson Stoner, Jason Earles, Jason Dolley and Nicole Gale Anderson.  Sometime later, the group won the N.B.T. (Next Big Thing) competition.

In 2009, the group was chosen to be a featured artist on Trinity Broadcasting Network's iShine KNECT, a Christian tween show hosted by Paige Armstrong. In 2010, after the departure of Jasmine, Jonnie and Brookie performed the show's new theme song, which is still featured today in the show's second season.

In 2011, Jonnie and Brookie continued to expand their fan base through the internet with YouTube. In June 2011, the duo created a new YouTube channel titled "TheJonnieandBrookie" that featured professionally created covers of popular artists such as Taylor Swift, Justin Bieber, One Direction, and Katy Perry.

In Early 2012, they left ishine Knect Because they cannot make it to season 4.

In 2012, Jonnie and Brookie continued to release covers by popular artists, while releasing four new singles: "Perfect Mine", "Sell Out", "When I Hear a Love Song" and "Hands Down".

In 2013, the group released covers by David Guetta and Robyn, also releasing a new single called "Talk About Love". They also performed at the NAMM music show.

Group members

Current members
 Jonnie Allen – vocals, guitar (born c. 1993)
 Brookie Allen – vocals, bass, additional guitar, keyboard (born c. 1995)

Discography

References

External links
 Official site

21st-century American composers
21st-century American women singers
21st-century women composers
American Christian musical groups
American girl groups
American women singer-songwriters
American child singers
American child musicians
American pop music groups
Christian pop groups
Singing talent show winners
Sibling musical duos
American women pop singers
American pop rock music groups
American pop rock singers
American rock songwriters
Child pop musicians
Participants in American reality television series
Musical groups established in 1998
People from Gilbert, Arizona
21st-century American singers
Singer-songwriters from Arizona